Pepper is a 1936 American comedy film directed by James Tinling and written by Jefferson Parker, Murray Roth and Lamar Trotti. The film stars Jane Withers, Irvin S. Cobb, Slim Summerville, Dean Jagger, Muriel Robert and Ivan Lebedeff. The film was released on August 8, 1936, by 20th Century Fox.

Plot
Wealthy John Wilkes (Irvin S. Cobb) is perfectly happy to live a grumpy and unfulfilled existence with only his money for company. Little girl Pepper Jolly (Jane Withers) worms her way into his life to turn his life upside down with frightening carnival rides and other adventures, while conspiring to keep Wilkes' daughter from making the mistake of her life.

Cast 
Jane Withers as Pepper Jolly
Irvin S. Cobb as John Wilkes
Slim Summerville as Uncle Ben Jolly
Dean Jagger as Bob O'Ryan
Muriel Robert as Helen Wilkes
Ivan Lebedeff as Baron Von Stofel
George Humbert as Socrates
Maurice Cass as Doctor
Romaine Callender as Butler
Tommy Bupp as Jimmy
Carey Harrison as Footman
Reginald Simpson as Chauffeur

References

External links 
 

1936 films
American comedy films
1936 comedy films
20th Century Fox films
Films directed by James Tinling
American black-and-white films
1930s English-language films
1930s American films